Esfaniyar or Esfandiar and similar transliterations may refer to:
 Esfandiar (name)
 Esfandiar, Bushehr, a village in Bushehr Province, Iran
 Esfandiar, Khuzestan, a village in Khuzestan Province, Iran
 Esfandiar, South Khorasan, a village in South Khorasan Province, Iran

See also
İsfendiyar (disambiguation)